Miss America is an annual competition open to women from the United States between the ages of 18 and 28. Originating in 1921 as a beauty pageant, the competition now judges competitors' talent performances and interviews in addition to their physical appearance.

In January 2018, the new board of directors increased the maximum age of titleholders to 25 years old, from 24. Therefore, contestants cannot be older than 25 years old on December 31 in the calendar year of her state competition.

In January of 2023, the new board of directors increased the maximum age of delegates to 28 years old, from 27. Thus, participants must be at least 18 by the date of competition, and no older than 28 in the year of her national competition.

Gallery of past Miss Americas

Winners

Winners by state

Debut wins

States have yet to win Miss America
There have been no Miss America winners from the following seventeen states: 

 Delaware
 Idaho
 Iowa
 Louisiana
 Maine
 Maryland
 Massachusetts
 Montana
 Nevada
 New Hampshire
 New Mexico
 Rhode Island
 South Dakota
 Vermont
 Washington
 West Virginia
 Wyoming

U.S. territories that do not participate Miss America now

 Canada (until 1963)
 Puerto Rico (until 2017)
 Virgin Islands (until 2015)

Notes

References

External links

Miss America official website

Miss America titleholders
Miss America titleholders
Miss American titleholders

ca:Miss Amèrica